The 1995–96 Saudi Premier League was won by Al-Hilal for the 7th time after defeating Al Ahli in the final played in Jeddah. Al Taawon and Al Raed, both of whom represented Buraydah were relegated.

Stadia and locations

Final league table

Playoffs

Semifinals

Third place match

Final

External links 
 RSSSF Stats
 Saudi Arabia Football Federation
 Saudi League Statistics

Saudi Premier League seasons
Saudi Professional League
Professional League